Tong Yao (born 11 August 1985), also known as Tanya Tong, is a Chinese actress, best known in film for portraying Chen Shu in A Big Deal (2011), May in Snowfall in Taipei (2012) and Annie Yang in To Love Somebody (2014), and has received critical acclaim for her television work, particularly as Meng Xizi in Militia Ge Erdan (2012), Zhou Xiaobei in Three Bosom Girls (2014), Song Renping in Like a Flowing River (2018) and Gu Jia in Nothing But Thirty (2020).

Early life 
On August 11, 1985, Tong was born in Kunming, Yunnan.

Education 
In 1996, she attended the Chinese Song and Dance Art School in Beijing. She returned to Kunming in the following year, when she was accepted to Kunming Art School. She spent a year studying Hulusi, which is a free reed wind instrument from China and the Shan State. She entered the Central Academy of Drama in 2002, majoring in acting.

Career
In 2002, Tong made her television debut in Tracks In The Snowy Forest, playing a health worker in the Northeast Democratic United Army named Bai Ru.

In 2006, Tong amassed a member of television credits namely My Sun, Walking Duster, and Life of Dragon and Tiger. She had a minor role as Pan Ying in The Young Warriors, a historical television series.

Tong had a cameo appearance in Moonlight Lady (2007), a historical television series based on the real life on Song dynasty poet Li Qingzhao. That same year, she also appeared in Repeat an Error and I Want to Understand You.

In 2008, she co-starred with Lin Shen in the romantic comedy film Afraid to Say Love You, which is her film debut. In the following year, Tong appeared in the film Nine Dragon Jade, in which she played You Erjie.

Her 2010 work includes Simple Dish, Lei Feng, Military Honour, Wind Up the First Pass and Qiao Longbiao. That same year, she starred with Xu Shaoyang in the thriller horror film Snapper.

In 2011, Tong was cast in comedy film A Big Deal.

As lead actress, she co-starred Liu Wei and Ni Ping in the romantic comedy film Wings (2012). And she starred as May, reuniting her with co-star Chen Bolin, who played her romantic interest, in Snowfall in Taipei, a film adaptation based on the Japanese novel of the same name. That same year, she was cast in war drama Militia Ge Erdan, playing the wife of Huang Bo's character.

In 2013, Tong played the female lead role in a business-themed romantic drama film Day of Redemption.

Tong played Annie Yang, the lead role in Francis Sung's directed film To Love Somebody. She had a supporting role in The White Haired Witch of Lunar Kingdom, a fantasy wuxia film.  She co-starred with Zhang Xinyi and Jiang Xin in the television series Three Bosom Girls.

In 2015, she played the love interest of Li Chen's character in the television series Boys to Men.

In 2016, three television work she headlined, Stepmother Xu Duoduo, My Spicy Girlfriend and Customize Happiness premiered.

In 2018, Tong starred as a key supporting role in the historical drama Ruyi's Royal Love in the Palace, alongside Wallace Huo and Zhou Xun. She gained popularity for her portrayal of the role as Gao Xiyue.
The same year, she starred in the period drama Like a Flowing River. Her performance garnered her the Best Supporting Actress at the Magnolia Awards.

In 2019, Tong was cast in the female-centric modern drama Nothing But Thirty.

In 2020, Tong began filming the spy drama The Rebel.

Endorsements
In 2020, Tong Yao became the Chinese ambassador for Estée Lauder. From April, 2021, she selected as a Giorgio Armani Crossroads brand ambassador,  and now a brand ambassador for Giorgio Armani in China.

On September 21, 2020, lingerie and lifestyle brand NEIWAI officially announced that Tong Yao would become its brand ambassador.

On November 30, 2021, she was announced as a brand ambassador for American luxury jewelry brand Tiffany & Co.

On February 21, 2021, she has been announced as the Giorgio Armani Beauty ambassador in China.

Personal life
On October 1, 2019, Tong Yao and Wang Ran, seventeen years her senior, married in an ancient castle in Italy. Wang Ran graduated from Harvard University and is the CEO of CEC Capital.

Filmography

Film

Television series

Awards and nominations

References

External links
 (credit as Yao Tong)
 
 

1985 births
People from Kunming
Actresses from Yunnan
Central Academy of Drama alumni
Living people
Chinese film actresses
Chinese television actresses
21st-century Chinese actresses